Crystal Castles II is the second studio album by Canadian electronic music duo Crystal Castles, released on May 24, 2010 by Fiction Records and Last Gang Records. The album was initially scheduled for release on June 7, 2010; however, the release dates were moved forward after the album leaked online, thus a digital version of the album was released on April 23, 2010.

On April 25, 2011, the album was reissued digitally under the title (II), which replaced the original version of "Not in Love" with the version featuring Robert Smith (of the Cure).

Background
The album was recorded by Ethan Kath in a variety of locations including an abandoned church in Iceland, a self-built cabin in northern Ontario, a garage behind an abandoned drug store in Detroit, as well as Paul Epworth's London studio. Of the experience, Kath said, "I recorded most of the record in the coldest winter in decades in a church without heat in Iceland. It was so cold that when I listen back I can hear myself shivering. I chose it because it felt right". In December 2009, Kath gave vocalist Alice Glass a CD-R containing 70 instrumental tracks, for which she then recorded vocals on 35 tracks.

In order to promote the album, the band released the first single "Celestica" in April and an EP titled Doe Deer was released only a few days later. In May the band physically released the album. The album reached number 48 on the UK Albums Chart and number 188 on the US Billboard 200. Later on in December, the duo's cover of the Platinum Blonde song "Not in Love", featuring guest vocals from Robert Smith of the Cure, was released as the album's third single. The single became Crystal Castles' highest-charting single to date.

Critical reception

Crystal Castles II received generally positive reviews from music critics. At Metacritic, which assigns a weighted mean rating out of 100 to reviews from mainstream critics, the album received an average score of 77, based on 24 reviews, which indicates "generally favorable reviews". Daniel Brockman of The Boston Phoenix praised the band for creating "a dense-yet-airy thicket of pure pop transcendence." MusicOMH also gave an extremely positive review, describing the album as "bold, dramatic, more than a little screwed-up and stunningly exciting statement." Pitchfork rated the album 8.5 out of 10, and awarded it their "Best New Music" accolade.

Commercial performance
As of July 2012, Crystal Castles and Crystal Castles II had sold a combined 174,000 copies in the United States, according to Nielsen SoundScan.

Accolades
The album was a longlisted nominee for the 2010 Polaris Music Prize.

Track listing

Notes
  signifies an additional producer.
  signifies an additional vocal producer.

Sample credits
 "Year of Silence" contains a sample of "Inní mér syngur vitleysingur" by Sigur Rós.
 "Vietnam" and "Violent Dreams" contain a sample of "A Walk in the Park" by Stina Nordenstam.

Personnel
Credits adapted from the liner notes of Crystal Castles II.

Crystal Castles
 Ethan Kath – production ; mixing 
 Alice Glass – vocals

Additional personnel

 Lexxx – vocal recording ; mixing 
 Paul Epworth – additional production, vocal recording ; guitar solo recording ; additional vocal production 
 Matthew Wagner – vocal recording 
 Jacknife Lee – production 
 Alex Bonenfant – vocal recording ; production ; mixing ; guitar recording ; drum recording 
 Christopher Chartrand – drum solo ; live drums
 X Tecumseh Clark – cover model
 Todd Tamanend Clark – photograph
 Marc Pannozzo – band photo
 Nilesh Patel – mastering

Charts

References

2010 albums
Albums produced by Jacknife Lee
Albums produced by Paul Epworth
Crystal Castles (band) albums
Fiction Records albums
Last Gang Records albums
Sequel albums